Jingle Jangle Comics was a ten-cent, bimonthly, 42-issue, 68-page (later reduced to 52-page) children's-oriented American comic book magazine published by Eastern Color under the Famous Funnies, Inc. imprint between February 1942 and December 1949. The series featured mixes of human and cartoon animal material. The series was edited by Steven Douglas with George L. Carlson as principal artist. Additional stories were drawn by David Tendlar.

George Carlson
George L. Carlson was in his mid-fifties and a veteran children's book illustrator and puzzle maker when he took on Jingle Jangle Comics. His experience included painting the first edition dust jacket for Margaret Mitchell's Gone with the Wind and ghosting the newspaper strip Reg’lar Fellas for artist Gene Byrnes. He had previously published Jingle Jangle Tales as a children's book and an unsuccessful Sunday newspaper page. Each issue of the comic book contained at least one of his two features (and many contained both): "Jingle Jangle Tales" and "The Pie-Face Prince of Pretzelburg". Carlson completed every aspect of his features himself – pencils, inks, etc. – earning $25 per page for the twelve pages he produced for each issue.

His stories included "The Youthful Yodeler and the Zig-Zag Zither", "The Fashionable Fireman and the Soft-Boiled Collar Button" and  "The Extra Salty Sailor and the Flat-Footed Dragon."

Analysis 
Carlson's sophisticated Jingle Jangle fairy tales mixed burlesque, fantasy, and wordplay with his own brand of nonsense in multi-layered features of visual and verbal harmony. Characters in his work included the Youthful Yodeler, the Half-Champion Archer, the Very Horseless Jockey, King Hokum of Pretzleburg and his son the pie-face Prince Dimwitri, the Princess Panetella Murphy (Dimwitri's love), the Raging Raja (Dimwitri's favorite enemy), and the Wicked Green Witch. Dimwitri's adventures were many and varied: in one tale, he went aloft in an 18-carat balloon in search of a missing bass drum and in another he searched for the Doopsniggle Prize with his corned-beef flavored cabbage plant.

Reception
Noted critic and science-fiction writer Harlan Ellison penned an ode to Carlson and Jingle Jangle in an essay called "Comic of the Absurd", published in the 1970 collection All in Color for a Dime. Ellison wrote,

References

Sources 
 
 

Comics magazines published in the United States
1942 comics debuts
1949 comics endings
Fantasy comics
Magazines established in 1942
Magazines disestablished in 1949
Golden Age comics titles